Harold Glenn Moulton (November 7, 1883, Le Roy, Michigan - December 14, 1965, Charles Town, West Virginia) was an American economist and longtime fellow at the Brookings Institution.  He authored several dozen books and papers exploring timely social and economic topics, including "Waterways versus Railways" (1912), "The Principals of Money and Banking" (1916), "Germany's Capacity to Pay" (1923), "The Reparation Question" (1924), "The Formation of Capital" (1935), "Control of Germany and Japan" (1944), and "Can Inflation be Controlled?" (1958).

Before joining Brookings Moulton was on the faculty of the economics department of the University of Chicago, where he served also as debate team coach.

In 1937 he was recognized by being invited to deliver the prestigious Charles P. Steinmetz Memorial Lecture at Union College.

References

1883 births
1965 deaths
20th-century American economists
University of Chicago faculty
People from Charles Town, West Virginia
Economists from West Virginia
People from Osceola County, Michigan
Brookings Institution people
Journal of Political Economy editors